The Residence of the Ambassador of the Netherlands in Washington, D.C. is a diplomatic residence owned by the Netherlands in the United States located at 2347 S Street, Northwest, Washington, D.C. in the Sheridan-Kalorama neighborhood.

References

External links
wikimapia
Residence of the Ambassador of the Netherlands (Owsley House)

Diplomatic residences in Washington, D.C.
Sheridan-Kalorama Historic District
Historic district contributing properties in Washington, D.C.
Netherlands–United States relations